Archie Clark or Archibald Clark may refer to:
 Archibald Clark (politician) (1805–1875), New Zealand MP
 Archie Clark (basketball) (born 1941), American retired basketball player
 Archie Clark (footballer) (1904–1967), English football player and manager

See also
 Archibald S. Clarke (1788–1821), U.S. Representative from New York